Katie Marie Richardson is a beauty queen who represented Australia in Miss World 2008 in South Africa. She studied for a degree in nutrition and dietetics with plans to earn a PhD in this field.

External links
 Miss Australia 2008
 www.missworldaustralia.com.au

1988 births
Living people
Miss World 2008 delegates
People from Wollongong
Australian beauty pageant winners